This is a comparison of online backup services.

Online backup is a special kind of online storage service; however, various products that are designed for file storage may not have features or characteristics that others designed for backup have. Online Backup usually requires a backup client program. A browser-only online storage service is usually not considered a valid online backup service.

Online folder sync services can be used for backup purposes. However, some Online Folder Sync services may not provide a safe Online Backup. If a file is accidentally locally corrupted or deleted, it depends on the versioning features of a Folder Sync service, whether this file will still be retrievable.

Comparison

Legend
Windows/Linux/Mac/iOS/Android/BlackBerry: Supported operating systems for thick client (native binary application), which provide background data transmission and setting services.
Zero knowledge:  The service provider has no knowledge of the user's encryption key, ensuring privacy of the backup data.
Secure Key Management: If yes, the user holds and controls the encryption key. If no, the service provider holds and controls the encryption key.
 Payment options/plans:
Limited MB plan: Pay per computer. Additional fee for storage over a threshold.
Unlimited MB plan: Pay per computer. Storage per computer is unlimited.
$/MB plan: Pay per unit of storage, but unlimited computers may share that storage.
Cloud hosted Net Drive: Cloud can serve storage over WebDAV, SMB/CIFS, NFS, AFP or other NAS protocol, allowing files to be streamed from the cloud. A change made to the cloud is immediately accessible to applications on all clients without needing to pre-download (sync) the file in full.
Sync: Synchronization between computers, and/or mobile devices (PDA, MDA,...)
Public Internet file hosting
Restore via physical media
Server location: Countries where physical servers are located.  Where the data will be located.
 Still in Beta version
 Whether the desktop client (if available) can detect and upload changes without scanning all files.
 Many backup services offer a limited free plan, often for personal use. Often it is possible to increase the free backup limit through coupons, referrals, or other means that are not included in this column. This column also does not include free trials that are only available for a limited period of time.
 External hard drive support: Can refer to an alternate backup destination or whether the service can back up external drives.
 Hybrid Online Backup works by storing data to local disk so that the backup can be captured at high speed, and then either the backup software or a D2D2C (Disk to Disk to Cloud) appliance encrypts and transmits data to a service provider. Recent backups are retained locally, to speed data recovery operations.
 Unlimited BW: If bandwidth capping or limits are used on accounts.

Comments
 Acronis 	 Up to five PCs, always incremental backups, remote access from the web 
 Backblaze 	 Data de-duplication; block-level incremental.
 Barracuda Backup Service 	 Data de-duplication; real-time hybrid on-site/off-site data back-up.
 BullGuard Backup 	 5 PC/license, fast upload speeds, mobile access, encrypted transfer and storage, password-protected settings, free 24/7 support.
 Carbonite 	 Block-level incremental, Home or Pro editions. iPhone/ Blackberry/ Android App available to remotely access data from the online backup (For Pro: Users of the computer which are backed up, not available for the Administrator of the Pro). Can manually select files to upload that are larger than 4 GB.
 Cloudberry Backup 	 Image & File Based backups, data de-duplication, block-level and multiple cloud providers supported.
 CloudJuncxion 	 Decentralized multi-cloud backup with integrated sharing, sync, backup, and Cloud NAS. Fault-tolerance against failure of a constituent cloud.  	
 Crashplan 	
 Unlimited destinations. Data de-duplication; block-level incremental. Can run server-free, exchanging backup space with friends and family.
 Datashield     High-level encryption, personalized encryption key, shared cloud drive, sync folder functionality .
 Dolly Drive 	
 Cloud storage that is specifically designed for the Mac. Also allows users to store files exclusively in the cloud for seamless access on any computer or mobile device.
 Diino 	 iPhone/Android app available. 
 Dropbox 	 Data de-duplication, delta sync, iPhone/Android/Blackberry app available. 
 Dropmysite 	 website backup, database backup, SFTP support, free up to 2 GB.
 Egnyte 	 Delta sync, Google Docs sync, user and group management
 ElephantDrive 	 Auto-transfer from defunct Xdrive.
 F-Secure [Steek acquired by F-Secure July 2009]
 Humyo 	 Humyo was acquired by Trend Micro and will become part of Trend Micro SafeSync. Humyo no longer accepts new clients.
 IASO Backup  	 Advanced data reduction technology. Data de-duplication mechanism. High level of scalability and cost effectiveness. 
 ICFiles 	 Secure File Share Storage. Proprietary license download client. High level security, SOC 2 TYPE II, ISO 27001,27017, 27018, CSA, PCI, HIPAA, CJIS, EU Model Clauses, on request private servers for FISMA and FedRAMP. 
 IDrive 	 Proprietary license download client. Automatic Selection. Continuous Data Protection. "Virtual drive" explorer.
 Jungle Disk 	 Proprietary license download client sample code.
 KeepVault 	 Real-time hybrid on-site and offsite data backup.
 Memopal 	 Cross-user de-duplication, delta sync.
 MiMedia 	 Initial seed via a MiMedia-owned external hard drive available (no extra cost, shipping included).
 Mozy 	 Data de-duplication; block-level incremental. "Mozy Data Shuttle" physical seeding service available for extra fee.
 Replicalia 	 Professional Backup for Professional Data.
 SpiderOak 	 Data de-duplication."Zero Knowledge" encryption. 
 StoreGrid Cloud        Byte-level incremental backup, local backup, Disk Image backup—BMR and physical seeding. 
 Syncplicity 	 Google Docs sync, Central Management with Business Console.
 TaniBackup (Cheap Backup)  Up to 10 TB per standard package. Extensible to over 300 TB per single account. Access via SMB/CIFS or SSH (including sftp, scp, rsync and so on). 100 GB for $2 per month.
 Tarsnap 	 Client source available; data de-duplication; block-level incremental.
 TeamDrive      Store encrypted data on any WebDAV server; supports working offline; files can be commented; built-in support for conflict resolution.
 Unitrends Vault2Cloud 	 Data de-duplication; hybrid on- and off-premises data backup; physical seeding.
 UpdateStar Online Backup 	 Data de-duplication; block-level incremental.
 Usenet backup	 Is the method of storing backup data on the usenet.
 Windows Live Mesh 	 Replaces windows live sync and windows live folder.
 Zetta Enterprise-grade Online Backup 	 Supports Linux, Mac OS, and Windows, high speed WAN optimization, SAS 70 certified data centers.
 Zmanda Cloud Backup 	 Available in German and Japanese languages, supports MS SQL Server, MS Exchange, SharePoint, MySQL Database, System State, Oracle.

Versioning
Any changes can be undone, and files can be undeleted.
 Acronis 	 Supports detailed history of changes to files with browsing by date or version number.
 Backblaze 	 Old versions of files are kept for 30 days by default; One-year or Forever Retention is optional.
 Box            Versioning is included in paid subscription
 Carbonite 	 Keeps old versions for up to three months. It keeps one version for each day of the past week, one version for each of the previous three weeks, and one version for each of the previous two months that the file has been backed up.  Versioning available for PC computers only; not available for Mac. 
 CloudJuncxion  Supports multiple versions less than a week old, one version less than two weeks old, one version less than month old, and one version older than a month.
 Crashplan 	 Options: All, or staged (daily, then weekly, etc.).
 Cubby          All previous versions and deleted files are kept until explicitly removed by the user or the user runs out of space. All deleted files and previous versions count towards the storage limit.
 Dolly Drive 	 Yes. Keeps unlimited versions of files.
 Dropbox 	 By default, Dropbox saves a history of all deleted and earlier versions of files for 30 days for all Dropbox accounts.
 Dropmysite 	 Provides incremental backups with the ability to download every snapshot.
 ElephantDrive  Any number of versions can be kept for any amount of time.
 Google Drive 	 Old versions of files are kept for 30 days or 100 revisions. Revisions can be set not to be automatically deleted.
 IASO Backup    All versions of files can be kept for different periods of time, starting from 1 month to 1 year or more. 
 ICFiles        No files are kept after delete, auto delete clears at every 24 hours. 
 iDrive         Up to 10 old versions of files are kept forever (until explicitly removed).
 Mozy          Old version of files are kept for 30 days. Pro 60 days, Enterprise 90 days.
 PowerFolder    Five versions are kept online. In the client it is configurable how many versions to store locally.
 SOS Online Backup (Infrascale)	 All versions are kept. Only the largest counts towards the storage limit.
 SpiderOak 	 All versions are kept. All files can be undeleted.
 SugarSync 	 Five versions are kept. Only the most recent version of each of existing files as well as deleted files count towards the storage limit.
 Sync.com 	 Sync.com saves a history of all deleted and earlier versions of files, 30 days for free accounts, indefinitely for premium plans.
 Syncplicity 	 Old versions of files, as well as deleted files, are kept for 30 days. Configurable for business or enterprise-class services.
 TeamDrive      All previous versions are kept and can be restored.
 Tresorit       Versioning is included in paid subscription
 Zetta Enterprise-grade Online Backup 	 All versions are kept. All files can be undeleted.

Other features and limitations
Other notable limitations or features.
 Baidu Cloud Must be registered by verified phone first.
 Box		 Performance degrades after 10,000 files in sync folder. Technical limit of 40,000 files in sync folder. Does not sync .tmp files, Outlook PST files, hidden files (hidden folders are synced), or any file or folder with \/*?":<>| in the name.
 CloudJuncxion  Decentralized fragment-and-disperse storage across a collection of heterogeneous clouds for maximal security. Supports a Virtual Private Cloud model for complete control by the enterprise customer. Supports Sync Groups for greater control over synchronization of files across multiple devices. 
 Dropbox Performance degrades with more than 300,000 files in sync folder. This is a soft limit.	
 Sugarsync	 Limited to 80,000 files per top level sync folder. To workaround, you can create multiple syncing folders, but each top level folder is limited to 80k files. Also, Microsoft outlook and Apple iTunes databases are unsupported.
 Trustbox      A 3-layer encrypted storage supports privacy for an unlimited file version retrieval. Restore any file from any point in time.

Defunct services 
Bitcasa closed its services in February 2017.
Copy was discontinued on May 1, 2016
 Dell DataSafe was discontinued on June 11, 2015.
 drop.io
 Mozy, shutdown in 2019, and it redirects users to Carbonite
 Norton Zone was discontinued on July 7, 2014.
 Streamload aka MediaMax
 Ubuntu One was discontinued on June 1, 2014.
 Windows Live Mesh
 Wuala was discontinued on November 15, 2015.
 Xdrive
 ZumoDrive

See also 
File hosting service
Remote backup service
Comparison of online music lockers
Comparison of file synchronization software
Comparison of file hosting services
Cloud storage
Shared disk access
File sharing
List of backup software

References

File hosting
Hard disk software
Cloud storage

Online services comparisons
 
 
 
Online backup
Comparison of online backup services